The American Bridge (also referred to as The Howe Bridges, or Nikolaev Railway Bridge until 31 December 2008) is essentially a group of railway bridges that connect the Bezymyannyi island (St. Petersburg) to the left bank of the Neva River via the Obvodny Canal, and provide links between the Central and Nevsky districts of the city of Saint Petersburg.

History 
The wooden bridges of the same design as now were constructed over the period 1840-1850 during the construction of the Nikolayevskaya Railway. The main construction works were supervised by the prominent American railroad engineer George W. Whistler to a design by William Howe, an American bridge builder and inventor.

The essence of the construction project was that the bridge's spans were expected to be a truss system of bracing wood design constricted by cross iron bars (this was the very novelty). Due to the presence of the metal parts, the bridge structure  became much stronger without substantial increases in overall weight.

The William Howe's system was theoretically checked and then improved by the Russian engineer Dmitrii Juravsky, who was an executive assistant to George W. Whistler during the construction of the railway line. Juravsky performed structural analyses and tests on physical models of Howe trusses from 1843 to 1848, and executed studies of the effect of posttension in Howe trusses. He published two books "About Bridges of the Howe System" in 1855 and 1856.

Juravsky was able to prove that the closer to a bridge's pillars, the greater the strain on the vertical tension bars and diagonal braces. So, he proposed to make the truss members of varying thickness depending on a specific location. His ideas were endorsed by Whistler, and then used in the construction of other rail bridges on this line. As the road was built in the forward direction, it was necessary to build 278 artificial structures.

Metal bridges 
The woden bridge across the Obvodny Canal was initially built by George W.Whistler using the Howe-Zhuravsky system. It had served well for about 30 years. However, in 1869, they decided to replace it with new metal spans. The design works were carried out by Nikolai Belelubsky, a famous Russian civil engineer, who built a lot of railroad bridges across the Russian Empire. Belelubsky proved to be a talented scientist and practitioner. Belelubsky managed to systematise then existing steel bridge designs and accordingly developed unified span structures.

Despite the constructive scheme of the wooden bridge was changed, the new metal structure resembled the former truss of the Howe-Zhuravsky system. Similar to its wooden predecessor, the new steel bridge had also a double-track structure.

As a result, the station of Saint-Petersburg (Major yard) experienced steady progress. Passengers and cargoes handled by the terminal increased rapidly alongside the expansion of rolling stock. Due to shortage of space on the left bank of the Obvodny Canal, it was necessary to build a new train maintenance depot on the right bank, as well as to construct new crossings.

In 1906, they erected a single-track American bridge number 2 on the downstream side along the existing metal bridge, which subsequently became number 1. In 1911, a double-track rail bridge with a "B" was added to the existing ones.

In 1913, they erected a double-track bridge with a "E", and in 1916 it was complemented with one more bridge with a "A", which resembled the railway bridge in Tsarskoye Selo across the Obvodny Canal on the railroad track at the Vitebsky railway station.

Name and numbering  
Since the construction completed, the first bridge has come to be known as “American“ for its design. Later, after the other bridges were opened for traffic, this name was also applied to them.

All five bridges started to be described as "Nikolaevsky railway bridge" in the official register of the city's environment objects names (according to the former names of the Moscow Station and Oktyabrskaya Railway (or October Railway).

However, on 31 December 2008, the bridges began to be called 'The American Bridge' by a resolution of the Government of St. Petersburg. The Government's decision was motivated by the fact that "it was referred to as American since the time it was built."

From the West to the East
the double-track bridge with a "A" under the first and third mainlines for suburban and passenger trains;
the single-track bridge with a "E" as a connecting track between the locomotive and car facilities of the station of Saint-Petersburg (Major yard), combined with the connecting passage (water supply, heat supply, network backbone, communication cables);
the locomotive and wagon facilities of the station of St. Petersburg (Major), combined with the communication unit (water supply, heat supply network backbone, communication cables);
the double-track bridge with a "B", where there are tracks connecting a storage yard to the New Park;
the 1st American single-track bridge for passenger trains;
the 2nd American double-track bridge, connecting the parks A-N and B-N to a freight yard and the first track.

Renovation 
Since 2006, the October Railway has been carrying out renovation of the bridge, the total reconstruction costs run to 4.5 billion rubles, for an overall work of 39 months.

The renovation aims to address the following:
 to rebuild or modernize the bridges on an ongoing basis;
 to integrate the bridges in the high-speed railway line St. Petersburg - Moscow;
 to transfer technical areas of the railway outside the city's limits to develop the vacated territories.

The renovation works have been carried out by "Mostostroy-6".

On 23 November 2007, a duplicate of the bridge with the letter "A" was opened for traffic (it is located further west of it). Now it carries the first and third main lines to Moscow. By design, the old bridge with a "A" was to be completely demolished, while a new one was to be erected on its site to a design by the institute "Lengiprotrans". The spans of 101.5 meters-long should be rested on just two pillars, while the former structure had six ones and was 25 meters shorter. The other American bridges were expected to be exactly the same. For their construction, metal arched trusses were expected to be used.

By the end of 2007, one of those crossings was almost completely built. For its construction, a two-story building was demolished that had been used as a remote control post of all traffic signals and arrows in the station St. Petersburg (Mayjor yard). It was expected that the new crossing would play a role of the old bridge with a "B", as just as its construction would have been completed by the end of that year.

However, in April 2008, the completion date was redefined, due to lack of coherence between Russian Railways and municipality, as well as the inconsistency of reconstruction works on the Ligovsky Prospect. The new dates were set as follows: static and dynamic tests were to be held on the bridge in early May. Load tests were to be taken place on 6 May 2008, whereupon the bridge was opened for shunting rail traffic.

References

External links 
 Николаевский железнодорожный мост в СПИГ
 Статья «Петербургские „американцы“» на сайте Юридический гид Санкт-Петербурга

Railway bridges in Russia
Truss bridges
Railway lines in Russia